Big Bang! is the second album by English alternative rock group Fuzzbox, released in 1989. It includes four singles which reached the UK Singles Chart: "International Rescue" (No. 11), "Pink Sunshine" (No. 14), "Self!" (featuring a guitar solo by Brian May of Queen, No. 24) and a cover of Yoko Ono's "Walking on Thin Ice" (No. 76).

Big Bang! remains the final studio album by Fuzzbox; a follow-up had been planned but was shelved by their record company WEA due to the lack of success of the projected album's lead single, "Your Loss, My Gain", released in 1990. The band then broke up.

Track listing

Charts and certifications

Weekly charts

Certifications

References

External links
Big Bang! at Discogs

1989 albums
We've Got a Fuzzbox and We're Gonna Use It albums
Warner Music Group albums
Geffen Records albums